The 1987–88 Scottish First Division season was won by Hamilton Academical, who were promoted four points ahead of Meadowbank Thistle. East Fife and Dumbarton were relegated to the Second Division.

Table

References

1987-1988
2
Scot